Bhaag Beanie Bhaag is an Indian romantic comedy web series featuring Swara Bhasker in the lead role. Directed by Abi Varghese, Debbie Rao and Ishaan Nair, it has Mona Ambegaonkar, Girish Kulkarni, stand-up comedians Varun Thakur and Ravi Patel in supporting roles. The direction of Ishaan Nair was critically panned and faced heavy criticism. It was released on Netflix on 4 December 2020.

Premise 
Facing disapproving parents, a knotty love life and her own inner critic, an aspiring comic ditches her cushy but unsatisfying life to pursue stand-up.

Cast 
 Swara Bhaskar as Bindhya "Beanie" Bhatnagar
 Varun Thakur as Arun, Beanie's boyfriend
 Ravi Patel, playing a fictionalised version of himself
 Mona Ambegaonkar as Shruti Bhatnagar, Beanie's mother
 Girish Kulkarni as Vasant Bhatnagar, Beanie's father
 Dolly Singh, as Kapi, Beanie's best friend

Episodes

Production 
The show is created by Neel Shah and Ravi Patel. It is directed by Abi Varghese, Debbie Rao and Ishaan Nair and produced by Shivani Saran, Ruben Fleischer, David Bernad and Seher Aly Latif. The show was earlier titled as Messy and is set in Mumbai.

According to Swara Bhasker, "The show is not just about comedy. It's about the journey of self-discovery of a girl who has imbibed the values that Indian society gives to girl children — which is to be obedient, to always listen to your parents and elders, and to place other people’s emotions over your own. It's a story that most girls, and especially girls from South Asia, can relate to. At same time, the parents are not villains. They are just normal people dealing with their own conditioning. It makes you hopeful that even if your parents don’t understand you today, maybe someday they will." She also revealed that she was "terrified of the standup portions".

Release 
The series released on 4 December 2020 on OTT media service Netflix.

Reception 
Saibal Chatterjee of NDTV, rating it 2.5 out of 5 stars writes that "Bhaag Beanie Bhaag is Swara's show all the way. She does justice to the it. The series, too thin at its core, does not complement her game effort. All the huffing and puffing the show has to do in order to keep up runs it ragged." Divyanshi Sharma of India Today wrote, "It is not a laugh riot, but it sure is a breath of fresh air which will also tickle your funny bone at times... Due to its plot, comparisons with Amazon Prime Video's The Marvelous Mrs. Maisel are inevitable. But once you become a part of Beanie’s world, all the comparisons take a backseat."

References

External links
 
 

Indian web series
Television shows set in Mumbai
2020 web series debuts
Indian television series distributed by Netflix
Hindi-language Netflix original programming
2020s Indian television series
Hindi-language web series